Haleh (also Romanized as Hāleh and Hālleh; also known as Hāleh-ye Jonūbī) is a village in Nayband Rural District, Chah-e Mobarak District, Asaluyeh County, Bushehr Province, Iran. At the 2006 census, its population was 641, in 97 families.

References 

Populated places in Asaluyeh County